The 2008 Eastern Illinois Panthers football team represented  Eastern Illinois University as a member of the Ohio Valley Conference (OVC) during the 2008 NCAA Division I FCS football season. The team was led by 21st-year head coach Bob Spoo and played their home games at O'Brien Field in Charleston, Illinois. The Panthers finished the season with an 5–7 record overall and a 3–5 record in conference play, placing sixth in the OVC.

Schedule

References

Eastern Illinois
Eastern Illinois Panthers football seasons
Eastern Illinois Panthers football